Diana Montague (born 8 April 1953) is an English mezzo-soprano, known for her performances in opera and as a concert singer.

Biography

English mezzo-soprano, Diana Montague, studied at the Royal Manchester (Northern) College of Music with Ronald Stear, Frederic Cox and Rupert Bruce-Lockhard.

Diana Montague is firmly established in the opera house, on the concert platform and in the recording studio. She made her debut as Zerlina with Glyndebourne Touring Opera in 1977. Since then she has appeared in the world’s leading opera houses and concert halls including the Royal Opera House Covent Garden in London, the Metropolitan Opera New York, La Monnaie Brussels, the Paris Bastille, Teatro Colón Buenos Aires. Her festival appearances include Bayreuth, Salzburg, Glyndebourne and Edinburgh. She was a member of the Royal Opera House Covent Garden in London from 1978: tour of the Far East and appearance as the Fox in a new production of The Cunning Little Vixen in 1990. She made her Bayreuth Festival debut in 1983, as Wellgunde and Siegrune in Der Ring des Nibelungen. Her debut in Chicago was in 1984 in the Missa Solemnis conducted by Georg Solti, at Edinburgh Festival in 1985 as Mélisande, at Salzburg Festival in 1986 as Cherubino. She made her Metropolitan Opera debut in New York in 1987 as Sextus in La Clemenza di Tito, returned to New York as Dorabella and as Nicklausse in Les Contes d'Hoffmann. Her German operatic debut was in 1987 as Dorabella in a new production of Così fan Tutte at the Frankfurt Opera. She appeared with Scottish Opera as Cherubino and Orlofsky and with English National Opera as Cherubino and Proserpina in Monteverdi's Orfeo; Promenade Concerts London in 1988 in Pelléas et Mélisande; Glyndebourne Opera in 1988 in Gluck's Orfeo. She sang The Fox in the Cunning Little Vixen at Covent Garden in 1990; Idamante in Idomeneo at the 1990 Salzburg Festival; Cherubino at the Vienna Staatsoper in 1990, and Lucio Silla in 1991; Glyndebourne in 1991 as Sextus in La Clemenza di Tito (also at the Promenade Concerts in London).

Diana Montague's repertoire includes the major roles for mezzo-sopranos in operas by Mozart, Gluck, Strauss, Rossini, Bellini and Berlioz. Opera engagements have included Benvenuto Cellini at Rome Opera; Iphigénie en Tauride in Buenos Aires, Madrid and with Welsh National Opera; Albert Herring, Le Nozze di Figaro, Andromaca in Rossini's Ermione and Ludmilla in The Bartered Bride at Glyndebourne Festival; Le Comte Ory in Lausanne, Rome and Glyndebourne; Proserpina in Monteverdi's Orfeo and Minerva in Il Ritorno d'Ulisse in Patria with De Nederlandse Opera in Amsterdam and in Sydney; Sesto in La clemenza di Tito in Madrid and Athens; Marguerite in La Damnation de Faust in Geneva, Composer in Ariadne auf Naxos at Scottish Opera and in Lisbon, the title role in George Frideric Handel's Susannah with Andrew Davis and the Orchestra of the Age of Enlightenment; Meg Page in Falstaff, The Bartered Bride and Die Meistersinger von Nürnberg at the Royal Opera Covent Garden, at the Edinburgh Festival and in London; Octavian in Der Rosenkavalier at the English National Opera, in Bilbao and in and at the Teatro Real in Madrid; Marguerite in Vienna; Idomeneo in Bilbao and Santiago de Compostela; Le Nozze di Figaro at La Monnaie Brussels and Opéra National du Rhin, Strasbourg. Her repertoire also includes such rarely performed works as Donizetti's Zoraide di Granata and Rosamonda d'Inghilterra and Meyerbeer's Il Crociato in Egitto (The Crusaders in Egypt).

Diana Montague's frequent concert engagements have included many performances with leading conductors including Georg Solti, James Levine, Riccardo Muti, John Eliot Gardiner, Seiji Ozawa, Jeffrey Tate, Neville Marriner and Andrew Davis and have included Mozart's C minor Mass at the Salzburg Festival, Berlioz's Les Nuits d'été in Athens and concerts in London and Vienna with the Academy of St Martin-in-the-Fields, Ravel's Shéhérazade and Mozart's C minor Mass in Madrid and Edward Elgar's Sea Pictures in Antwerp and Ghent. Concert engagements have also included the Mozart Requiem, J.S. Bach's B minor Mass (BWV 232), Rossini's Stabat Mater and The Damnation of Faust by Berlioz.

Recent opera engagements include Marcellina in Le Nozze di Figaro for the Royal Opera House, Covent Garden, Glyndebourne and English National Opera; Madame Larina in Eugene Onegin at Covent Garden and Venus in The Coronation of Poppea at the English National Opera. Future engagements include L.v. Beethoven Symphony No. 9 with the Royal Philharmonic Orchestra conducted by Danielle Gatti, Marcellina, Lyric Opera of Chicago and Annina in Der Rosenkavalier at Covent Garden.

Diana Montague's recordings include Bellini's I Capuleti e i Montecchi (Bruno Campanella/Nuova Era) and Clothilde in Norma (Richard Bonynge/Decca), Donizetti's Lucia di Lammermoor (Richard Bonynge/Teldec), Franck's Les Béatitudes (Helmuth Rilling/Hänssler), Gluck's Iphigénie en Tauride (John Eliot Gardiner/Phillips), G.F. Handel's Dixit Dominus and Nisi Dominus (Simon Preston/Deutsche Grammophon), Janácek's The Cunning Little Vixen (Simon Rattle/EMI), Monteverdi's Orfeo (John Eliot Gardiner/DGG), Mozart's Idomeneo and The Marriage of Figaro (both Parry/Chandos), Mozart's C minor Mass (Philips), Rossini's Le Comte Ory (John Eliot Gardiner/Phillips), Strauss' Der Rosenkavalier (Parry/Chandos), a solo CD of French repertory and a CD devoted to 19th Century bel canto rarities. For Opera Rara, she has recorded Donizetti’s Zoraida di Granata and Rosmonda d’Inghilterra and Meyerbeer’s Il Crociato in Egitto. Her versatility can also be experienced on the Opera Rara recital disc Diana Montague - Bella Immagin.

Recordings
Montague appears on several full-length opera recordings, including the rarities Rosmonda d'Inghilterra, Zoraida di Granata, and Il crociato in Egitto, all for Opera Rara. Her other opera recordings include:
Le Comte Ory – Count Ory: John Aler; tenor, Isolier: Diana Montague, mezzo-soprano; Countess Adèle: Sumi Jo, soprano; Dame Ragonde: Raquel Pierotti, mezzo-soprano; Alice: Maryse Castets, soprano; Orchestra and Chorus of the Opéra de Lyon conducted by Sir John Eliot Gardiner. Label: Philips
Iphigénie en Tauride – Iphigenie: Diana Montague, mezzo-soprano; Oreste: Thomas Allen, baritone; Pylade: John Aler, tenor; Monteverdi Choir; Orchestras of the Opéra de Lyon conducted by Sir John Eliot Gardiner. Label: Philips

See also
 Monteverdi: Il ritorno d'Ulisse in patria (Raymond Leppard recording)

References

External links
Diana Montague on the Peter Moores Foundation
Artist's biography on Intermusica Artists' Management

1953 births
Living people
Operatic mezzo-sopranos
English mezzo-sopranos
Musicians from Winchester
Alumni of the Royal Northern College of Music
20th-century British women opera singers
21st-century British women opera singers